White of the Eye is a 1987 British horror-thriller film directed by Donald Cammell, starring David Keith and Cathy Moriarty. It was adapted by Cammell and his wife China Kong from the 1983 novel Mrs. White, written by Margaret Tracy (pseudonym of the brothers Laurence and Andrew Klavan).

Plot
A series of murders of rich young women throughout the area of Globe, Arizona, bear the distinctive signature of a serial killer. Clues lead Detective Charles Mendoza to Paul White, a sound expert installing hi-fi systems in wealthy people's homes. His special talent is to make a noise which echoes through the air cavities in his head and shows him where the sound of the speakers should come from and echo in the room. He is married to Joan, whom, ten years earlier, he had seduced away from Mike DeSantos, who was her then-boyfriend. Paul and Joan have a daughter, Danielle.

Paul, installing equipment at Dr. Sutter's home, proximal to the most-recent murder, is approached by Mendoza—they have a cordial conversation about sound equipment, but it turns abruptly when Mendoza asks Paul if he still hunts. Mendoza questions Paul about whether he knew the victim, and then asks him about the tires on his van—a tread pattern that has been located at the scene of the murder. At the police station, Mendoza's partner Phil has uncovered Paul's criminal record—they speculate on what kind of person he might be based on that information. Mendoza, working from photos of the crime scene, begins to identify some aspects of the killer's modus operandi.

Various flashbacks show Joan's previous relationship to Mike, traveling across the country from New York City in Mike's van, heading for Malibu. The couple met Paul, whom Mike befriended. At Mike's suggestion, the two men go on a deer hunting trip together. Paul shoots a deer and then brutally mutilates it, winding up with blood all over his face, revealing a frightening and incongruous aspect to his personality. Mike later catches Joan and Paul having sex. He puts a gun to the back of Paul's head but relents and leaves.

In the present-day, Joan, on her way to Stope's Creek, stops in a gas station asking for directions. As she walks around the building to the restroom, she hears a voice singing a familiar song—Mike. As they sit and catch up, Mike mentions that he's been in prison and that he received a serious head injury which seems to have given him the ability to see the past and the future. He emphatically asks Joan to promise not to tell Paul that she has seen him.

Joan suspects that Paul is having an affair with Ann Mason, a local married socialite, when she finds his truck parked behind her house. She stabs his tires flat, which winds up providing him with an alibi for the most-recent murder. Distraught, Joan runs to her home bathroom to vomit and, somehow, notices something odd about the inlaid soap-dish on the raised bathtub. She pries the inlay loose and looks inside, and sees something strange: plastic bags with body parts inside. Joan confronts Paul, who explains he has been "chosen" to put women "out of their misery," but he loves Joan.

Joan's continuing distrust of Paul agitates him into a fury. He locks her up in a portion of the attic, then dons an explosive vest and facepaint. Increasingly unhinged, Paul chases his daughter up through the attic, and minutes after accusing Joan of thinking that he'd "hurt my own kid," attempts target practice of her fleeing form, missing Danielle, but killing their dog Shasta. Joan and the little girl escape in different directions and soon Joan has to elude Paul in the abandoned quarry. It turns out Mike has been staying there, armed with a machine gun, certain that he will meet Paul again. He rescues Joan and takes away Paul's gun, leading him to the edge of the quarry. Paul makes the sound he uses in the emptiness of living rooms and savors its echo from the quarry. While incessantly pontificating about his philosophies of life and death, Paul reveals a lighter with which he has lit the fuse of his explosive vest. Mike opens fire on him with a machine gun and Joan dives into the lake in the quarry. Paul and Mike both die instantly, in a hail of destruction. Joan is reunited later with her daughter. She talks with Detective Mendoza about what the ten years with Paul could have meant, whose destructive and nihilistic nature she never realized.

Cast

 David Keith as Paul White
 Cathy Moriarty as Joan White
 Alan Rosenberg as Mike DeSantos
 Art Evans as Detective Charles Mendoza
 Michael Greene as Phil Ross
 Danielle Smith as Danielle White
 Alberta Watson as Ann Mason
 William G. Schilling as Harold Gideon
 David Chow as Fred Hoy
 Marc Hayashi as Stu
 Mimi Lieber as Liza Manchester
 Pamela Seamon as Caryanne
 Bob Zache as Lucas Herman
 Danko Gurovich as Arnold White
 China Cammell as Ruby Hoy
 Richard Lester (uncredited) as Tucson detective

Soundtrack

The soundtrack album for White of the Eye features 10cc's Rick Fenn and Pink Floyd's Nick Mason. This album was remastered and released digitally and as a part of the Unattended Luggage CD/vinyl box set on August 31, 2018.

 "Goldwaters"
 "Remember Mike"
 "Where Are You Joany?"
 "Dry Junk"
 "Present"
 "The Thrift Store"
 "Ritual"
 "Globe"
 "Discovery and Recoil"
 "Anne Mason"
 "Mendoza"
 "World of Appearances"
 "Sacrifice Dance"
 "White of the Eye"

Reception

In The Spectator the author and critic Hilary Mantel described it as "A violent and ambitious thriller."

References

External links

 
 

1987 films
1987 horror films
1980s serial killer films
1987 thriller films
1980s slasher films
British horror thriller films
British slasher films
Films based on American novels
Films directed by Donald Cammell
Films set in Arizona
Paramount Pictures films
Films produced by Elliott Kastner
1980s English-language films
1980s British films
1980s horror thriller films